Lubbockiidae is a family of cyclopoid copepods in the order Cyclopoida. There are about 7 genera and 15 described species in Lubbockiidae.

Genera
These seven genera belong to the family Lubbockiidae:
 Atrophia Huys & BÃ¶ttger-Schnack, 1997
 Haplopodia Huys & BÃ¶ttger-Schnack, 1997
 Homeognathia Huys & BÃ¶ttger-Schnack, 1997
 Laitmatobius Humes, 1987
 Lubbockia Claus, 1863
 Pseudolubbockia G. O. Sars, 1909
 Rhamphochela Huys & BÃ¶ttger-Schnack, 1997

References

Cyclopoida
Articles created by Qbugbot
Crustacean families